The 1949 Cal Aggies football team represented the College of Agriculture at Davis—now known as the University of California, Davis—as a member of the Far Western Conference (FWC) during the 1949 college football season. Led by first-year head coach Ted Forbes, the Aggies compiled an overall record of 5–4 with a mark of 4–0 in conference play, winning the FWC title. The Cal Aggies were outscored by their opponents 160 to 138 for the season. They played home games in Davis, California, as the newly-opened Aggie Field, which was renamed Toomey Field in 1962.

Schedule

Notes

References

Cal Aggies
UC Davis Aggies football seasons
Northern California Athletic Conference football champion seasons
Cal Aggies football